Trevor Thomas may refer to:
Trevor Thomas (actor), British actor
Trevor Thomas (athlete), in Athletics at the 1966 Central American and Caribbean Games
Trevor Thomas (art historian), (1907–1993), British art historian and curator
Trevor Thomas (hiker), American blind hiker
Trevor Thomas (historian) (1934–2020), historian at the School of Slavonic and East European Studies
Trevor Thomas (rugby) (born c. 1909), rugby union, and rugby league footballer of the 1930s and 1940s
Trevor Thomas (Colonel), Antiguan Chief of Defence